The Lower Passaic River in New Jersey is the section of the Passaic River below the Great Falls which flows over the Dundee Dam to the river mouth at Newark Bay in the northeastern part of the state. Its midpoint  generally delineates the Essex-Hudson and Passaic-Bergen county lines. Numerous spans, mostly moveable bridges, have been built over of the lower reaches of the river, which is tidally influenced to the dam at about mile point (MP) 17.4 and channelized to about MP 17. Once one of the most heavily used waterways in the Port of New York and New Jersey, it remains partially navigable for commercial marine traffic. While requests have significantly diminished since the mid-late 20th century, the bridge at MP 11.7 and those downstream from it are required by federal regulations to open with advance notice, with the exception of the first at MP 1.8, which is manned and opens on demand.

Early fixed crossings included turnpikes, sometimes built as plank roads. Wood, and later, metal bridges were constructed by competing railroads to access railyards, carfloat operations, passenger terminals, and ferries on the Hudson Waterfront. Rail lines led to further industrialization, urbanization-suburbanization, and the construction of vehicular bridges and streetcar lines. The advent of automobile age in the early and mid 20th century saw the building of highway bridges.

The Acquackanonk Bridge was dismantled in 1776 as George Washington retreated from Fort Lee. Another with the same name at the crossing was lost to flooding in 1903. The first railroad swing bridge in the United States was built in 1833. Numerous bridges have been demolished or fallen into disuse, while others have had their swing spans removed, replaced or immobilized. Some have been rebuilt or replaced.

Crossings

Abbreviations

CNJ=Central Railroad of New Jersey
CSXT=CSX Transportation
DL&W=Delaware, Lackawanna and Western Railroad
Erie=Erie Railroad
H&M=Hudson and Manhattan Railroad
NRHP=National Register of Historic Places
NJDOT=New Jersey Department of Transportation
NJRHP=New Jersey Register of Historic Places
NJT=New Jersey Transit
NYS&W=New York, Susquehanna and Western Railway
NS=Norfolk Southern Railway
PATH=Port Authority Trans-Hudson
PRR=Pennsylvania Railroad
PS=Public Service Railway

See also

List of crossings of the Upper Passaic River
 Timeline of Jersey City area railroads
 List of bridges, tunnels, and cuts in Hudson County, New Jersey
 List of crossings of the Hackensack River
 List of NJT moveable bridges
 List of fixed crossings of the North River (Hudson River)

Notes

Sources

External links

Bridges in New Jersey

Transportation in Hudson County, New Jersey
Transportation in Bergen County, New Jersey
Transportation in Essex County, New Jersey
Transportation in Passaic County, New Jersey
Transportation in Newark, New Jersey
Bridges in Essex County, New Jersey
Bridges in Hudson County, New Jersey
Bridges in Passaic County, New Jersey
Bridges in Bergen County, New Jersey
Passaic River